Wi Seo-yeong (Hangul: 위서영; born March 15, 2005) is a South Korean figure skater. She is the 2022 CS Nebelhorn Trophy silver medalist.

On the junior level, she is the 2019 JGP France silver medalist and the 2018 South Korean junior national champion. She placed in the top six at two World Junior Championships (2020, 2022).

Personal life 
Wi Seo-yeong was born on March 15, 2005, in Seoul, South Korea.

Career

Early career 
Wi is the 2018 South Korean junior national champion. She is considered part of the second generation of "Yuna Kids," South Korean ladies who began skating after being inspired by 2010 Olympic Champion Yuna Kim.

2018–2019 season 
Wi made her junior international debut at the 2018 Asian Open Trophy in August, where she won the bronze medal behind teammate Lee Hae-in and American Gabriella Izzo. She then received her first Junior Grand Prix assignments, placing fourth at both 2018 JGP Czech Republic and 2018 JGP Armenia. Competing as a senior domestically for the first time, Wi placed sixth at the 2019 South Korean Championships and was not selected for the 2019 World Junior Championships team.

2019–2020 season 
Wi opened the season by winning her first Junior Grand Prix medal, silver, at 2019 JGP France behind Kamila Valieva and ahead of Maiia Khromykh, both of Russia. She became the fifth Korean lady to score above 190 points internationally at the event. Wi's medal set off a series of consecutive medal wins by Korean ladies on the 2019–20 Junior Grand Prix. At her second event, 2019 JGP Poland, she finished fourth behind Alysa Liu, Viktoria Vasilieva, and Anastasia Tarakanova. She then competed at the 2019 Asian Open Trophy in November, winning gold by over 30 points ahead of teammate Ji Seo-yeon and Hong Kong's Hiu Yau Chow.

Wi finished fourth in the senior division at the 2020 South Korean Championships, behind You Young, Lee Hae-in, and Kim Ye-lim. As a result, she was named to the 2020 World Junior Championships team alongside Lee. At the 2020 World Junior Championships, Wi placed sixth in the short program after her flying sit spin was invalidated. She said: "It’s my first Junior Worlds, so I was very nervous today. I did no big mistakes, so I’m very satisfied." Wi improved to fifth in the free skate to finish sixth overall. Her placement, combined with Lee's, earned South Korea three spots for the next season.

2020–2021 season 
With the COVID-19 pandemic greatly curtailing competitive opportunities for South Korean skaters, Wi competed first at the 2021 South Korean Championships, finishing fifth.

2021–2022 season 
With the resumption of the regular international season, Wi was assigned to make her Grand Prix debut at the 2021 NHK Trophy, where she finished in ninth place.

Due to her national result, Wi was named to South Korea's team for the 2022 World Junior Championships, but events would soon complicate the situation. Shortly after the conclusion of the 2022 Winter Olympics, Russia invaded Ukraine. As a result, the International Skating Union banned all Russian athletes from competing at ISU championships. As Russian women had dominated international figure skating in recent years, this had a significant impact on the field. Due to both the invasion and the Omicron variant, the World Junior Championships could not be held as scheduled in Sofia in early March and were rescheduled for mid-April in Tallinn. Wi placed fifth in the short program. She was sixth in the free skate after falling on her final double Axel attempt but remained in fifth place overall.

2022–2023 season 
Wi began the season with her Challenger series debut at the 2022 CS Nebelhorn Trophy, winning the silver medal and placing first in the free skate. Given one Grand Prix assignment, she was eighth at the 2022 NHK Trophy.

Programs

Competitive highlights 
GP: Grand Prix; JGP: Junior Grand Prix

Detailed results

Senior level

Junior level

References

External links 
 

2005 births
Living people
South Korean female single skaters
Figure skaters from Seoul